T10 cricket or Ten10 cricket is a short form of cricket. Two teams play a single innings, which is restricted to a maximum of ten overs (60 legal balls) per side, with the game lasting approximately 90 minutes. The first competition using this format took place in December 2017, the opening season of the T10 League in the United Arab Emirates. The International Cricket Council (ICC) officially sanctioned the league. In May 2020, Eoin Morgan, the captain of the England cricket team, supported the idea of using the format at the Olympics, with former international cricketers Virender Sehwag and Shahid Afridi also supporting the idea. In June 2022, Cricket West Indies became the first full-member cricket board to start a T10 competition, which is called The 6ixty. Later that year, Sri Lanka Cricket and Zimbabwe Cricket announced plans to start their own T10 competitions in 2023.

Rules
 A bowler can bowl a maximum of two overs.
 The powerplay (a period of the game during which additional fielding restrictions are in effect) in each innings lasts three overs. 
 In some T10 competitions, the third powerplay over is a "floating" powerplay which can be "activated" by the batting team during any of the overs after the first two of the innings.
 Ties are broken by playing a Super Over. (If the tie persists, more Super Overs may be played until there is a winner at the end of one of the Super Overs).

T10 leagues
In 2019, the Caribbean Premier League featured two exhibition women's T10 cricket matches, each played before two of the knockout matches.

In May 2020, Cricket West Indies announced that the first edition of the Vincy Premier T10 League would start on 22 May 2020 but was postponed due to the COVID-19 pandemic. The Vanuatu T10 Blast started one day earlier in Port Vila. In June 2020, Sri Lanka Cricket (SLC) announced the commencement of the first edition of the PDC T10 League. A number of other minor T10 leagues have been started, such as the Cricket Fiji Vakataukata T10 League and the Malaysia T10 Bash.

Abu Dhabi T10 League

The Abu Dhabi T10 league is a T10 league played in the United Arab Emirates. It was approved by the ICC. The first edition was won by the Kerala Kings. In the second edition, the Pakhtoons were defeated by the Northern Warriors. In 2019 the Maratha Arabians beat the Deccan Gladiators to win the third edition. In 2020, the league hired former ICC Chief Executive Haroon Lorgat in part to help globalize the T10 format.

The league has seen significant year-on-year growth in viewership and economic value, with the 2021-2022 edition of the tournament having reached 342 million viewers through television and digital streaming, and the league's economic impact now being valued at USD $621.2 million.

Qatar T10 League
The Qatar T10 League was founded in Doha and has six teams. Shahid Afridi became the league's brand ambassador. The league had 24 international cricket players, 12 players from associate countries and Qatar national cricket team players. In the first edition, the Falcon Hunters were victorious, beating the Swift Gallopers. All of the matches were hosted at the Asian Town International Cricket Stadium Doha. In December 2019, the ICC opened an anti-corruption investigation after fixers were caught.

European Cricket League
The European Cricket League (ECL) is a T10 league featuring 30 domestic champions from countries across Europe.

The 6ixty 
The 6ixty is a T10 league organized by Cricket West Indies and the Caribbean Premier League that is scheduled to be played four times a year, starting with a five-day men's and women's tournament in August 2022. A number of significant changes are made to the usual rules of T10 cricket: 

 Teams are all out (i.e. they can't bat anymore) upon losing 6 wickets, rather than 10. 
 The first 5 overs of each innings will all be bowled from one end of the pitch, with the other 5 overs bowled from the other end. 
 Fielding teams must bowl the 10 overs of an innings within 45 minutes, or they lose a fielder during the final over.
 The batting team can 'unlock' a third powerplay over by hitting two sixes in the initial two powerplay overs.

Lanka T10 League 
The Lanka T10 league will be organised by Sri Lanka Cricket (in partnership with the Abu Dhabi T10) and take place annually in Sri Lanka. It will have a men's edition featuring six men's teams and a women's edition featuring four women's teams.

Africa T10 
Cricket Kenya will start a T10 league in 2023 called Africa T10. Similar to the Abu Dhabi T10, teams will be able to have 9 overseas (non-Kenyan) players, with one of them required to be from an African country and one from an Associate member nation.

Zim Afro T10 
Zimbabwe Cricket is going to start a franchise-based T10 league, with its inaugural season starting on 29 March, 2023.

Differences from other cricket formats 
T10 cricket is notably shorter than other cricket formats; the shortest format of cricket played at the international level is T20 cricket, in which games are 20 overs per side and last approximately 3 hours. Because of its relative shortness, there is a greater emphasis on fast scoring and hitting boundaries.

Reactions 
There have been various positive and negative reactions to T10 cricket, all largely pertaining to the shortness of the format.

Support 

 Many Associate members of the International Cricket Council have argued in favor of T10 cricket becoming an additional international format of cricket and being played at the Olympics, as they believe that the shorter format is more appealing to new fans, and makes it possible to play more games in a day in a single stadium. 
 The possibility of completing competitions in a shorter period of time with the T10 format may enable it to be played in more venues, as well as potentially making it more attractive to top-tier cricket players. 
 The approximately 90-minute duration of the T10 format may make it a good competitor against other sports of similar time durations, such as association football.
 Some batters have said that T10 cricket will help batters score more runs in longer formats, while some bowlers have said that the increased pressure on bowlers in T10 will help them play better in longer formats.

Criticism 
 The shorter format has meant that some players have simply not been able to bat or bowl in some matches within the first few years of T10 matches being played. Such a thing has only occurred in more than a hundred years of Test cricket (when also excluding players who didn't take any catches) 14 times.
 Bowlers have argued that they would have no role in the game, since they only can bowl a maximum of two overs. Others counter that bowlers have been able to perform in T10 matches.
 In two years of games from the T10 League, the team batting second won the game 70.2% of the time, meaning that teams gained a significant advantage by winning the coin toss at the start of the game. By contrast, chasing teams only won 54.7% of all T20 matches (excluding games with no winner) in 2016.
 The leagues themselves have been questioned for not adequately preparing for or setting up games. One instance where this was argued was when a T10 League match was abandoned due to the officials not having the DLS rules on hand, as well as when two games ended without any attempt at a tiebreaker such as a Super Over.
 There are allegations and concerns around corruption taking place in T10 competitions.
 There are concerns that adding an additional format of cricket alongside the three current international formats could reduce the long-term value of the existing T20 leagues, as well as squeezing out some of the other three formats.

See also
T20 cricket, the shortest international format of cricket

References

T10 cricket